The 2005 Players Championship was a golf tournament in Florida on the PGA Tour, held  at TPC Sawgrass in Ponte Vedra Beach, southeast of Jacksonville. It was the 32nd Players Championship. 

Fred Funk became the oldest champion at age 48, one stroke ahead of runners-up Luke Donald, Tom Lehman, and Scott Verplank. Because of numerous weather delays, the second round was completed on Sunday, the third on Monday morning, followed by the final round. Funk played 32 holes on Monday in blustery conditions.

Defending champion Adam Scott finished four strokes back, in a tie for eighth place.

Venue

Field
Stephen Allan, Michael Allen, Robert Allenby, Stephen Ames, Billy Andrade, Stuart Appleby, Tommy Armour III, Woody Austin, Aaron Baddeley, Briny Baird, Craig Barlow, Brian Bateman, Cameron Beckman, Rich Beem, Thomas Bjørn, Mark Brooks, Bart Bryant, Jonathan Byrd, Tom Byrum, Ángel Cabrera, Mark Calcavecchia, Chad Campbell, Paul Casey, Alex Čejka, K. J. Choi, Daniel Chopra, Stewart Cink, Tim Clark, Darren Clarke, José Cóceres, Fred Couples, Ben Curtis, John Daly, Robert Damron, Chris DiMarco, Luke Donald, Joe Durant, David Duval, Steve Elkington, Ernie Els, Bob Estes, Nick Faldo, Brad Faxon, Todd Fischer, Steve Flesch, Carlos Franco, Harrison Frazar, Fred Funk, Jim Furyk, Robert Gamez, Sergio García, Brian Gay, Brent Geiberger, Tom Gillis, Matt Gogel, Retief Goosen, Richard Green, Jay Haas, Todd Hamilton, Pádraig Harrington, Dudley Hart, J. J. Henry, Mark Hensby, Tim Herron, Charles Howell III, David Howell, John Huston, Peter Jacobsen, Freddie Jacobson, Lee Janzen, Miguel Ángel Jiménez, Zach Johnson, Kent Jones, Steve Jones, Jonathan Kaye, Jerry Kelly, Skip Kendall, Hank Kuehne, Neal Lancaster, Bernhard Langer, Stephen Leaney, Tom Lehman, Justin Leonard, J. L. Lewis, Frank Lickliter, Peter Lonard, Davis Love III, Steve Lowery, Jeff Maggert, Hunter Mahan, Shigeki Maruyama, Len Mattiace, Scott McCarron, Graeme McDowell, Shaun Micheel, Phil Mickelson, Kevin Na, Nick O'Hern, Arron Oberholser, Joe Ogilvie, Geoff Ogilvy, Ryan Palmer, Rod Pampling, Jesper Parnevik, Craig Parry, Dennis Paulson, Corey Pavin, Pat Perez, Craig Perks, Tom Pernice Jr., Kenny Perry, Tim Petrovic, Carl Pettersson, Ian Poulter, Nick Price, Ted Purdy, Brett Quigley, Tag Ridings, Chris Riley, Loren Roberts, John Rollins, Justin Rose, Rory Sabbatini, Adam Scott, John Senden, Patrick Sheehan, Joey Sindelar, Vijay Singh, Heath Slocum, Jeff Sluman, Chris Smith, Andre Stolz, Kevin Sutherland, Hal Sutton, Hidemichi Tanaka, Vaughn Taylor, David Toms, Kirk Triplett, Bob Tway, Bo Van Pelt, Scott Verplank, Duffy Waldorf, Mike Weir, Lee Westwood, Jay Williamson, Tiger Woods

Round summaries

First round
Thursday, March 24, 2005

Source:

Second round
Friday, March 25, 2005
Saturday, March 26, 2005
Sunday, March 27, 2005

Source:

Third round
Sunday, March 27, 2005
Monday, March 28, 2005

Source:

Final round
Monday, March 28, 2005

Scorecard
Final round

Cumulative tournament scores, relative to par

Source:

References

External links
The Players Championship website
Full Leaderboard

2005
2005 in golf
2005 in American sports
2005 in sports in Florida
March 2005 sports events in the United States